Torin Nathaniel Smith (born September 30, 1961) is a former professional American football player. Smith attended Mesa Community College and he graduated from Hampton (Institute) University. Smith made his professional debut in the NFL in 1987 with the New York Giants. He played for the New York Giants for his entire 1-year career. 

Smith is married to Regine Malebranche-Smith, a registered nurse who grew up in Quebec, Montreal. Together they have 2 boys Reggie and Torin Jr . The former football player is now a geography/civics teacher at Workman Middle School in Pensacola, Florida. He was also the head coach for the Workman Middle School Lady Jags basketball team and track club.  During the 2011–2012 school year, his Lady Jags basketball team went undefeated (10–0) and won the Escambia County Middle School Basketball Championship. Also during the 2012 school year, his Lady Jags track club won the Escambia County Middle School Track Championship. He won his second Escambia County Basketball Championship during the 2014-2015 school year.  His Lady Jags basketball team finish the season with a record of 11-1. Also, during this time, Coach Smith was the Athletic Director at the Escambia County Boys and Girls Club. While there his basketball teams won multiple AAU sanctions basketball tournaments and championships. Coach Smith has been busy trying to making a difference in young people lives for the better. Before being a school teacher, he made a career out of working with juvenile delinquents, emotionally disturbed teenagers, mentoring, and being a bodyguard at rock concerts, as well as for personal celebrities.

References

1961 births
Living people
New York Giants players
Schoolteachers from Florida